Martha McMillan Roberts (1919-1992) was an American photographer.

Her work is included in the collections of the Museum of Fine Arts Houston and the Los Angeles County Museum of Art.

References

1919 births
1992 deaths
20th-century American photographers
20th-century American women artists